Sir Robert David Hugh Boyd FRCP, FFPH, FRCPCH, FMedSci (born 14 May 1938) is a British paediatrician and head of research and Development for Greater Manchester NHS. From 1989 to 1993 he was Dean of the Medical School and Professor of Paediatrics at the University of Manchester. From 1993 to 1996 he was Chair of the Manchester Health authority. He was Principal of St George's Hospital Medical School, University of London, 1996–2003, and Pro-Vice-Chancellor of the University of London from 2000 to 2003. He was made a Knight Bachelor in 2004. He is the son of James Dixon Boyd.

Publications
 Placental Transfer-Methods and Interpretations (co-ed., 1981), 
 Perinatal Medicine (co-ed., 1983), 
 Paediatric Problems in General Practice (jtly, 1989, 3rd ed. 1997),
 Placenta (ed., 1989–95)

References 

1938 births
Living people
British paediatricians
Fellows of the Royal College of Physicians
Fellows of the Royal College of Paediatrics and Child Health
Fellows of the Academy of Medical Sciences (United Kingdom)
Knights Bachelor
Academics of the University of London
People associated with St George's, University of London
Academics of the Victoria University of Manchester
British medical administrators
British people of American descent
British people of Irish descent